Arnstadt Hauptbahnhof or Arnstadt Central Station is a railway station in the town of Arnstadt in Thuringia, Germany. It is situated on the meeting point of the Erfurt-Schweinfurt, Arnstadt–Saalfeld and Arnstadt-Ichtershausen lines.

History
The station was opened on May 16, 1867, then as the southern terminus of the railway line to Erfurt. In 1869, a line to Plaue and Ilmenau was added at the southern end of the station. In 1894, a third line to Saalfeld was opened.

The station saw a number of long-distance services calling before World War II, for example the fast trains from Berlin to   Stuttgart. Its importance diminished however after the German division, even though it still had long distance trains to Suhl and Berlin calling at the station. In the 1990s, InterRegio services called at Arnstadt.

The former depot is now used as a depot for heritage steam engines.

Train services
The station is served by the following service(s):

References

Railway stations in Thuringia
Buildings and structures in Ilm-Kreis
Railway stations in Germany opened in 1867